Jérémy Hélan (born 9 May 1992) is a French former professional footballer who played as a left midfielder. He last played for Sheffield Wednesday, whom he joined from Manchester City for an undisclosed fee in July 2013. He retired from football in September 2016.

Career
Born in Clichy-la-Garenne, Hélan started his career in the youth team of AS. Jeunesse d' Aubervilliers from the age of eleven and stayed with the club until 2007. He then joined the Clairefontaine academy for a season, before joining Stade Rennais.

Manchester City
Helan controversially signed for Manchester City in February 2009 after deciding to see out the remainder of his professional contract with Rennes, and was accordingly suspended from international football for a month. For the remainder of the 2008–09 season and during the next two seasons Hélan established himself as a regular player in the City Elite Development Squad. In 2011, Hélan was among six players from the Elite Development Squad to be included for the pre-season tour in Poland. The following year also saw Hélan signed a new contract with the club.

He made his debut for the club on 25 September as a 106th-minute substitute as they lost a Football League Cup third round match to Aston Villa.

Loan spells
In October 2011, Hélan joined League One side Carlisle United on a one-month loan deal. He made his professional debut for his new loan club in a 3–0 win over Yeovil Town at Huish Park after coming on as a substitute for Jon-Paul McGovern. Hélan also made another appearance against Exeter City on 5 November 2011, where he played for 16 minutes, in a 0–0 draw. After this, Hélan returned to his parent club despite the club were about to extend his loan spell for the second month.

On 25 October 2012, Hélan joined League One side Shrewsbury Town on a one-month loan deal. He made his debut two days later, in a 2–2 draw at home to Colchester United. Hélan went on to make three more appearances before being recalled by his parent club on 22 November 2012.

Sheffield Wednesday
On 22 November 2012, he signed on loan for Sheffield Wednesday on a one-month loan deal. He made his debut two days later, playing the full 90 minutes in a 2–0 defeat at home to Leicester City. He scored his first goal for the club on 22 December in a 2–0 win at home to Charlton Athletic. Two days later, his loan spell with the club was extended until 19 January 2013. On 29 December 2012, in a match against Huddersfield Town which ended 0–0, he was involved in a bizarre incident where he was "twice booked" by the referee but did not get sent off as the first yellow card was mistakenly given to his teammate Michail Antonio instead of Hélan for diving. On 30 January 2013, Hélan rejoined Sheffield Wednesday on loan until the end of the season and went on to finish the 2012–13 season, scoring once in twenty-eight appearances.

Despite attracted the attention of a host of clubs after rising to the fore with the Owls, such as Wolves, and was told by the Manchester City management that he would be loaned out once again, Hélan signed for Sheffield Wednesday on a permanent basis, signing a four-year contract, keeping him until the summer of 2017 in the summer. Upon joining the club, Hélan was given number seventeen shirt for the new season.

Hélan's first game after signing for the club on a permanent basis came in the opening game of the season, where he made his first start of the season, in a 2–1 loss against Queens Park Rangers. Three weeks later on 24 August 2013, Hélan scored his first goal since his return to the club on a permanent basis, in a 2–2 draw against Millwall. Hélan then scored his second goal for the club, in a 2–1 win over Huddersfield Town on 22 February 2014. As the 2013–14 season progressed, Hélan started out playing in the left-wing position at first, but switched to a left-back position following the club's defensive crisis. Hélan finished his first permanent season at Sheffield Wednesday, making 43 appearances and scoring two times in the 2013–14 season.

Ahead of the 2014–15 season, Hélan suffered an abductor strain during a friendly match against Doncaster Rovers and was expected to be sidelined between four and six weeks. Although he missed the first two games, Hélan made his return to training and made his first appearance of the season, coming on as a substitute for Jacques Maghoma, in a 1–1 draw against Millwall on 19 August 2014. Hélan then scored his first Sheffield Wednesday goal of the season, in a 2–0 win over Birmingham City on 16 September 2014 and then provided an assist for Atdhe Nuhiu to score the only goal in the game, in a 1–0 win over Wigan Athletic on 30 December 2014. Five days later, on 4 January 2015, Hélan played 90 minutes against his former club, Manchester City, in third round of FA Cup, which they lost 2–1. Hélan finished the 2014–15 season at Sheffield Wednesday, making 38 appearances and scoring once.

The 2015–16 season saw Hélan found himself competing with Rhoys Wiggins over a left-back position. However, in a match against Brentford on 26 September 2015, Hélan received a red card after a second bookable offence, in a 2–1 win for Sheffield Wednesday. After returning from suspension, Hélan found himself rotated under the newly management of Carlos Carvalhal, which saw him being used in the first team in and out, mostly on the substitute bench. Following his loan spell at Wolverhampton Wanderers came to an end, Hélan made his return to the Sheffield Wednesday first team, coming on as a late substitute, and was booked soon after, in a 1–1 draw against Derby County on 23 April 2016. He also appeared in the last game of the season, where he made his first start, against Wolves, the club he played between January and April, in a 2–1 loss. Hélan was featured in the Championship play-off final, coming on as a substitute for Ross Wallace in the 63rd minute, in a 1–0 loss against Hull City. Hélan later finished the 2015–16 season, making 17 appearances.

Wolverhampton Wanderers (loan)
On 25 February 2016, Hélan moved on loan for the remainder of the 2015–16 season to fellow Championship side Wolverhampton Wanderers. Hélan made his Wolverhampton Wanderers debut two days later, making his first start and playing 90 minutes, in a 2–1 win over Derby County. Following this, Hélan was given a handful of first team appearances that led to a possible permanent move made in the summer. However, due to his parent club's lack of defensive option, Hélan was recalled by the club on 21 April 2016. Though recalled, Manager Kenny Jackett stated that Hélan could one day make his return to Wolverhampton Wanderers.

Although he appeared once for Sheffield Wednesday in the 2016–17 season, it was announced on 18 September 2016 that Hélan announced his decision to retire from football, at the age of 24, in order to focus on his Islamic religion and his disillusionment with the game was another factor. However, his contract with Sheffield Wednesday did not expire until the end of the 2016–17 season.

International career
Hélan previously represented France U-16, France U-17 and France U-19.

Personal life
In an interview with News and Star, Hélan stated he had an ambition to have a career in football. Hélan speaks English and French and currently learning Arabic. Hélan is a devout Muslim and spent increasing amounts of time at a mosque in Saudi Arabia that he intended to go to once he retired.

Career statistics

References

External links

1992 births
Living people
French footballers
Sportspeople from Clichy, Hauts-de-Seine
Association football midfielders
Manchester City F.C. players
Carlisle United F.C. players
Shrewsbury Town F.C. players
Sheffield Wednesday F.C. players
Wolverhampton Wanderers F.C. players
English Football League players
INF Clairefontaine players
France youth international footballers
French expatriate footballers
Expatriate footballers in England
French Muslims
Footballers from Hauts-de-Seine